Allahabad (also Romanized as Allāhābād; also known as  Deh-e Yāsā’ī) is a village in Sar Asiab-e Farsangi Rural District, in the Central District of Kerman County, Kerman Province, Iran. At the 2006 census, its population was 14, in 4 families.

References 

Populated places in Kerman County